Opera House Casino was a casino located on Las Vegas Boulevard North in North Las Vegas, Nevada.  The casino was owned by Silver Nugget Gaming.

History
The casino was purchased, along with the Silver Nugget, by Silver Nugget Gaming in January 2007 for $23.8 million.

In January 2015, an agreement was announced to sell the casino to Nevada Restaurant Services, the parent company of Dotty's.

The casino closed in 2014 and has since been demolished. A Dotty's casino was subsequently built and opened on the property.

References 

Buildings and structures in North Las Vegas, Nevada
Defunct casinos in the Las Vegas Valley
2014 disestablishments in Nevada

pl:Opera House Casino